The 1899 Tennessee Volunteers football team represented the University of Tennessee in the 1899 Southern Intercollegiate Athletic Association football season. They were the first Tennessee team to have a head coach. J. A. Pierce helmed the team in 1899 and 1900. The 1899 Tennessee Volunteers won six games and lost two.

Schedule

References

Tennessee
Tennessee Volunteers football seasons
Tennessee Volunteers football